Elections to the Labour Party's Shadow Cabinet (more formally, its "Parliamentary Committee") were announced on 28 October 1983. In addition to the 15 members elected, the Leader (Neil Kinnock), Deputy Leader (Roy Hattersley), Labour Chief Whip (Michael Cocks), Labour Leader in the House of Lords (Lord Cledwyn of Penrhos), and Chairman of the Parliamentary Labour Party (Jack Dormand) were automatically members.

Denis Healey, who had previously been automatically a shadow cabinet member as Deputy Leader, topped the poll.  Robin Cook, Michael Meacher and Giles Radice joined the cabinet; Jones and Meacher had not stood in 1982.

Footnotes
Notes

References

1983
1983 elections in the United Kingdom
October 1983 events in the United Kingdom